Greenlees is a surname. Notable people with the surname include:

Allison Greenlees (1896–1979), Scottish Girlguide
Don Greenlees (born 1875), Scottish footballer
Duncan Greenlees (1899–1966), theologist
Gavin Greenlees (1930–1983), Australian poet
Georgina Greenlees (1849–1932), Scottish artist
Jack Greenlees, Scottish actor
James Greenlees (1878–1951), Scottish rugby player and educationist
Robert Greenlees (1820–1894), Scottish artist and educationalist
Ronalyn Greenlees (born 1971), Filipino lawn bowler
Thomas Duncan Greenlees (1858–1929), Scottish psychiatrist
Weir Greenlees (1882–1975), English cricketer and distiller
Ysobel Greenlees (1902–1996), Scottish golfer and founder of the Greenlees Trophy League

See also
Greenlee (surname)
Greenlees, an area of Cambuslang, Scotland